The Elliott Cresson Medal, also known as the Elliott Cresson Gold Medal, was the highest award given by the Franklin Institute. The award was established by Elliott Cresson, life member of the Franklin Institute, with $1,000 granted in 1848. The endowed award was to be "for some discovery in the Arts and Sciences, or for the invention or improvement of some useful machine, or for some new process or combination of materials in manufactures, or for ingenuity skill or perfection in workmanship." The medal was first awarded in 1875, 21 years after Cresson's death.

The Franklin Institute continued awarding the medal on an occasional basis until 1998 when they reorganized their endowed awards under one umbrella, The Benjamin Franklin Awards.

List of recipients
A total of 268 Elliott Cresson Medals were given out during the award's lifetime.

See also

 List of engineering awards
 List of physics awards

References

Science and technology awards
Franklin Institute awards
Awards established in 1848
Awards disestablished in 1998